This is a list of American artist printmaking societies and print clubs in chronological order of their founding. Note: The purpose of this timeline is to focus on the organization of artist printmakers into societies, and not to focus on clubs of collectors. The distinction between "society" and "club" is not necessarily reflected in the name of the organization nor in the inclusion of an organization in this list.

References

 Engelbrecht, Theresa Moir. "Inter-Collected: The Shared History of the Print Club and Museum Collection," Art in Print Vol. 7 No. 2 (July–August 2017). 
 Fredericks, Stephen A., personal email correspondence with Maryly A. Snow, 2009
 Goddard class syllabus Goddard, Stephen. History of Art 706, University of Kansas
 Kushner, Marilyn S. Genesis of the Twentieth-Century Print Club, pages 82–95, in American Identities: Twentieth-Century Prints from the Nancy Gray Sherrill, Class of 1954, Collection. Wellesley, MA : Davis Museum and Cultural Center, Wellesley College, c2004. 309 pp.
 

Printmaking groups and organizations